Cryptonatica bathybii is a species of predatory sea snail, a marine gastropod mollusk in the family Naticidae, the moon snails.

Description
The maximum recorded shell length is 16.4 mm.

Habitat
Minimum recorded depth is 150 m. Maximum recorded depth is 2000 m.

References

Naticidae
Gastropods described in 1789